Grégory Labille (born 10 July 1968) is a French politician from the Union of Democrats and Independents.

Political career 
In the 2017 French legislative election, Labille was a substitute.

He was co-opted as Member of Parliament for Somme's 5th constituency when incumbent MP Stéphane Demilly was elected to the French Senate in the 2020 French Senate election.

He lost his seat in the first round of the 2022 French legislative election.

References 

1968 births
Living people
People from Tourcoing

Deputies of the 15th National Assembly of the French Fifth Republic
21st-century French politicians
Union of Democrats and Independents politicians
People from Somme (department)